Zeng Shen (505–435 BC), better known as Zengzi (Master Zeng), courtesy name Ziyu, was a Chinese philosopher and disciple of Confucius. He later taught Zisi (Kong Ji), the grandson of Confucius, who was in turn the teacher of Mencius, thus beginning a line of transmitters of orthodox Confucian traditions. He is revered as one of the Four Sages of Confucianism.

Life

Zeng Shen was 46 years younger than Confucius. He was a native of South Wu City in the State of Lu, and was the son of Zeng Dian, one of the earliest disciples of Confucius.

When he was sixteen, he was sent by his father to study under Confucius. Confucians later considered him to be his second most senior student, after Yan Hui. Duanmu Ci said of him, "There is no subject which he has not studied. His appearance is respectful. His virtue is solid. His words command credence. Before great men he draws himself up in the pride of self-respect. His eyebrows are those of longevity." He was noted for his filial piety, and after the death of his parents he could not read the rites of mourning without being led to think of them and being moved to tears. He was a voluminous writer. He composed ten books, compiled in the Rites of the Elder Dai. He was said to have composed and/or edited the Classic of Filial Piety under the direction of Confucius. He was also associated with transmission of the Great Learning. He was first associated with the sacrifices to Confucius in 668 AD, but in 1267 he was advanced to be one of Confucius' Four Assessors. His title, "Exhibitor of the Fundamental Principles of the Sage", dates from the reign of the Jiajing Emperor, when he was associated with Yan Hui.

Zengzi established his own school, and taught Zisi (Kong Ji), the grandson of Confucius, who was in turn the teacher of Mencius, thus beginning a line of transmitters of orthodox Confucian traditions. Along with Yan Hui, Zisi, and Mencius, Zengzi is considered to be one of the Four Sages of Confucianism.

Filial piety

Zeng Shen was known for his filial piety. After the deaths of his parents, he was unable to read the rites of mourning without bursting into tears.

A famous legend about Zeng Shen, called Nie Zhi Tong Xin, is included in the influential Yuan dynasty text The Twenty-four Filial Exemplars. In the story, Zeng Shen was one day out gathering firewood, when some visitors unexpectedly showed up at his home. His mother bit her finger, and Zeng felt a sharp pain in his heart. He immediately knew his mother needed him and rushed home.

Descendants
In 1452 the title Wujing Boshi was bestowed upon the descendants of Zengzi and other Confucian sages such as Mencius, Yan Hui, Zhou Dunyi, and Zhu Xi.

In the Republic of China there is an office called the "Sacrificial Official to Zengzi" which is held by a descendant of Zengzi, like the post of "Sacrificial Official to Mencius" for a descendant of Mencius, "Sacrificial Official to Yan Hui" for a descendant of Yan Hui, and the post of "Sacrificial Official to Confucius", held by a descendant of Confucius.

Some of the descendants of Zengzi include:
 Zeng Gong, 43rd Generation descendant, Northern Song essayist, one of the Eight Great Prose Masters of the Tang and Song
 Zeng Guofan, 70th Generation descendant, Qing dynasty military leader and statesman
 Zeng Guoquan, 70th Generation descendant, Qing dynasty military leader and official, Zeng Guofan's younger brother
 Tsang Hin-chi, 74th Generation descendant, Hong Kong businessman, member of the Standing Committee of the National People's Congress
 Donald Tsang, 74th Generation descendant, 2nd Chief Executive of Hong Kong
 Tsang Yam-pui, 74th Generation descendant, Commissioner of Police of Hong Kong, Donald Tsang's younger brother

References

Citations

Bibliography

External links
  Website on the Zeng family

505 BC births
435 BC deaths
Disciples of Confucius
5th-century BC Chinese philosophers
5th-century BC Chinese people
People from Linyi
Philosophers from Lu (state)
Twenty-four Filial Exemplars